Big Business is a 1988 American comedy film starring Bette Midler and Lily Tomlin, each playing two roles, as sets of identical twins mismatched at birth. The nature versus nurture farce adapts The Comedy of Errors, but with female siblings in contemporary society: one of each twin being reared in a wealthy urban setting, while the others grew up in a poor rural environment.

Produced by Touchstone Pictures, the film co-stars Fred Ward, Edward Herrmann, Joe Grifasi, and Seth Green, as well as siblings Michael Gross and Mary Gross. Directed by Jim Abrahams, critical reaction to the film as a whole was generally lukewarm. Both Midler and Tomlin were nominated for the American Comedy Award for Funniest Actress in a Motion Picture for their performances with Midler winning.

Plot

In 1948, wealthy businessman Hunt Shelton and his pregnant wife are lost in rural West Virginia when Mrs. Shelton goes into labor near the town of Jupiter Hollow. At the local hospital, they are turned away, because it is exclusively for employees of Hollowmade, the local furniture maker. Mr. Shelton purchases the company on the spot, and Mrs. Shelton is then admitted. The Ratliffs, an impoverished couple, arrive moments later with Mrs. Ratliff also in labor. Both women give birth to twin girls, and the elderly nurse attending the doctor confuses and mixes up the sets of twins. Mr. Ratliff overhears the Sheltons deciding to name their daughters Rose and Sadie, and suggests the same names to his wife.

Forty years later, the Shelton sisters are now co-chairwomen of Moramax in New York City, a conglomerate that is the successor to their father's business interests. Sadie Shelton is focused on her career to the detriment of her family, while Rose Shelton wishes for a simpler life in the country. As part of her business plan, Sadie plans to sell Hollowmade, but must get stockholders' approval to proceed. In Jupiter Hollow, Rose Ratliff has risen to the position of forewoman at the Hollowmade Factory, and is also very career-driven. Meanwhile, Sadie Ratliff has always felt misplaced in rural life, and wishes for a more sophisticated life in a big city. Rose discovers Moramax's plans to sell Hollowmade, and makes plans to travel to New York City to stop the sale. Wanting to see the city, Sadie agrees to join her sister.

While Sadie Shelton makes plans for the shareholders' meeting, she learns from her employee Graham Sherbourne that "R. Ratliff" plans to come to New York with his sister to stop the sale. Sadie orders Sherbourne to locate "R. Ratliff" to prevent them from appearing at the meeting. A series of mixups at JFK Airport leaves the Shelton sisters stranded while the prospective buyer of Hollowmade, Mr. Fabio Alberici, takes their limousine back to the Plaza Hotel with the Ratliff sisters. The Ratliffs are checked into the Sheltons' suite, and the Sheltons take the suite next door, leading to a series of near-misses between the four sisters, and the men who are pursuing them romantically. In the meantime, Graham and his assistant/boyfriend assume that a visitor from Jupiter Hollow, Rose Ratliff's beau Roone Dimmick, is actually "R. Ratliff".

All sisters discover their mixup in the lobby bathroom. After Sadie Shelton acts like she will call off the Hollowmade sale, Rose Ratliff calls her out on the strip mining plans. Rose Shelton then realizes that Sadie has been lying to her, and helps the Ratliffs trap her in the broom closet. Rose Ratliff sits outside the broom closet to keep Sadie Shelton trapped, while Rose Shelton and Sadie Ratliff attend the shareholders' meeting and stop the sale of Hollowmade. Both sets of twins later leave the Plaza hotel with their newfound loves.

Cast
 Bette Midler as Sadie Shelton / Sadie Ratliff
 Lily Tomlin as Rose Ratliff / Rose Shelton
 Fred Ward as Roone Dimmick
 Edward Herrmann as Graham Sherbourne
 Michele Placido as Fabio Alberici
 Daniel Gerroll as Chuck
 Barry Primus as Michael
 Michael Gross as Dr. Jay Marshall
 Deborah Rush as "Binky" Shelton
 Nicolas Coster as Hunt Shelton
 Patricia Gaul as Iona Ratliff
 J.C. Quinn as Garth Ratliff
 Norma MacMillan as Nanny Lewis
 Joe Grifasi as Desk Clerk
 John Vickery as Hotel Manager
 John Hancock as Older Harlan
 Mary Gross as Judy
 Seth Green as Jason
 Leo Burmester as Bum
 Lucy Webb as Wenona
 Roy Brocksmith as Dr. Parker
 Carmen Argenziano as Board Member (uncredited)
 Chick Hearn as himself (uncredited)
 Shirley Mitchell as Stockholder (uncredited)

Production

The movie was originally written for Barbra Streisand (Midler's role) and Goldie Hawn (Tomlin's role). The plot playfully combines three recognizable stories: Aesop's The Town Mouse and the Country Mouse, Mark Twain's The Prince and the Pauper, and Shakespeare's The Comedy of Errors.

The production company could not get the rights to film at the actual Plaza Hotel in New York City, so it had the hotel replicated on a Walt Disney Studios sound stage. To recoup construction costs, Disney built a sitcom titled The Nutt House around it. Jim Abrahams said he staged one of the boardroom scenes based on an experience he had when a large agency used many employees to get him to sign with them.

Reception
Critical reaction to the film as a whole was generally lukewarm. Rotten Tomatoes reports that 42% of critics gave the film a positive rating, based on 19 reviews, with an average score of 5/10. Sheila Benson from the Los Angeles Times called Big Business a "bright whirligig of a movie" and added: "As you watch its buoyant hilarity, the intricacies flow smoothly as honey off a spoon [...] Like a sensational party the night before, "Big Business" may not bear the closest scrutiny in the cold light of day, but it gives an irresistible glow at the time. And when it gets on a roll, it's a movie with more wit to its lines and a more pungent array of them than much of the mishmash that has passed as Bette Midler's Greatest Movie Hits." Philadelphia Daily News writer Ben Yagoda felt that the film was "big fun. Lily Tomlin and Bette Midler are a double dose of hilarity. Call out the National Guard — Big Business is a laugh riot".

In his review for The New York Times, Vincent Canby remarked that Big Business, "though it never quite delivers the boffo payoff, is a most cheerful, very breezy summer farce, played to the hilt by two splendidly comic performers...Sometimes [the film's writers] do have trouble in characterizing the two sets of twins, allowing them to blend in such a way that the comic edge finally becomes blurred. Yet the film moves at such a clip, and with such uncommon zest, that it's good fun even when the invention wears thin." Roger Ebert, writing for the Chicago Sun-Times, gave the film two out of four stars. He declared the film "an endless and dreary series of scenes in which the various twins just barely miss running into each other in the Plaza Hotel," and found that it felt "unfinished" and missed a payoff. Variety called the film "a shrill, unattractive comedy." The staff felt that Midler's "loud brashness generally dominated [Tomlin's] sly skittishness".

John Simon of the National Review called Big Business a "dreadful film".

Box office
In the United States, Big Business debuted within the top three on the box-office chart and became a modest success, eventually grossing $40.2 million during its domestic run.

Home media
The film was released to VHS, Betamax, and Laserdisc in 1989 by Touchstone Home Video, with a DVD release in 2002. In 2011, Big Business was among a selection of titles from Touchstone and Hollywood Pictures to be licensed to Mill Creek Entertainment on behalf of Disney, and a DVD and Blu-ray disc were released of the film. The DVD is available on its own, as a double-feature with Straight Talk, and as a triple-feature with Straight Talk and V.I. Warshawski.

In December 2017, Big Business and Scenes from a Mall were re-released on DVD and Blu-ray by Kino Lorber under license from Walt Disney Studios Home Entertainment.

References

External links
 
 
 
 

1988 films
1980s buddy comedy films
1980s business films
1980s female buddy films
American business films
American buddy comedy films
American female buddy films
1980s English-language films
Films scored by Lee Holdridge
Films about twin sisters
Films based on The Comedy of Errors
Films directed by Jim Abrahams
Films set in hotels
Films set in 1948
Films set in 1988
Films set in New York City
Films set in West Virginia
Touchstone Pictures films
Twins in fiction
1988 comedy films
1980s American films